Gaius Atinius Labeo is the name of at least two Roman praetors:

Gaius Atinius Labeo (praetor 195 BC)
Gaius Atinius Labeo (praetor 190 BC)

and possibly

Gaius Atinius (praetor 188 BC)